
Gmina Kostomłoty is a rural gmina (administrative district) in Środa Śląska County, Lower Silesian Voivodeship, in south-western Poland.

It is part of the larger Wrocław metropolitan area.

Neighbouring gminas
Gmina Kostomłoty is bordered by the gminas of Kąty Wrocławskie, Miękinia, Mietków, Środa Śląska, Udanin and Żarów.

Villages
The gmina contains the villages of Bogdanów, Budziszów, Chmielów, Czechy, Godków, Jakubkowice, Jarząbkowice, Jenkowice, Karczyce, Kostomłoty, Lisowice, Mieczków, Osieczna, Osiek, Paździorno, Piersno, Piotrowice, Pustynka, Ramułtowice, Samborz, Samsonowice, Siemidrożyce, Sikorzyce, Sobkowice, Świdnica Polska, Szymanowice, Wichrów, Wilków Średzki, Wnorów and Zabłoto.

Twin towns – sister cities

Gmina Kostomłoty is twinned with:
 Sierentz, France

References

Kostomloty
Środa Śląska County